A child superhero or child superheroine is a fictional child or adolescent who is noted for feats of courage and nobility, and who usually has a colorful name, costume, and abilities beyond those of normal young human beings. As with real children, the term refers to characters who are under the age of 19  during the course of a fictional work. The following is a list of such characters.

List of child superheroes and superheroines

Ordered by biological age as of first superheroics

References

 
Superhero
Child